The knockout stage of the 2013 CONCACAF Gold Cup started on July 20 and ended with the final on July 28, 2013.

Qualified teams
The group winners and runners-up and the two best third-placed teams from the group stage advanced to the knockout stage.

Bracket

All times listed are U.S. Eastern Daylight Time (UTC−4).

Quarter-finals

Panama vs Cuba

Mexico vs Trinidad and Tobago

United States vs El Salvador

Honduras vs Costa Rica

Semi-finals

United States vs Honduras

Panama vs Mexico

Final

Notes

References

External links

2013 CONCACAF Gold Cup